The 1822 Massachusetts gubernatorial election was held on April 1.

Federalist Governor John Brooks was re-elected to a seventh term in office over Republican William Eustis.

General election

Candidates
John Brooks, incumbent Governor since 1816 (Federalist)
William Eustis, U.S. Representative and former U.S. Secretary of War (Republican)

Results

Notes

References

Governor
1822
Massachusetts
November 1822 events